John Thomas "Jay Tee" Kamara (born 10 May 2002) is an Sierra Leonean professional footballer who plays as a midfielder for Columbus Crew 2.

Club career
Kamara began his career with Alaska FC before joining the Montverde Academy. On January 27, 2021, Kamara joined USL Championship club Louisville City.

On 13 April 2021, Karama was loaned out to USL League One club North Carolina FC for the 2021 season. He made his professional debut for the club on 8 May against Greenville Triumph, starting in the 2–1 defeat.

On February 18, 2022, Kamara was transferred to Columbus Crew 2, the reserve side of Major League Soccer's Columbus Crew, ahead of their inaugural MLS Next Pro season.

Career statistics

References

External links
 Profile at North Carolina FC

2002 births
Living people
Sierra Leonean footballers
Association football midfielders
Louisville City FC players
North Carolina FC players
USL League One players
Sierra Leonean expatriate footballers
Expatriate soccer players in the United States
Montverde Academy alumni
Columbus Crew 2 players
MLS Next Pro players